Milk delivery is a delivery service dedicated to supplying milk. This service typically delivers milk in bottles or cartons directly to customers' homes.  This service is performed by a milkman, milkwoman, or milk deliverer. (In contrast, a cowman or milkmaid tends to cows.)

Delivery

In some countries, when a lack of good refrigeration meant that milk would quickly spoil, milk was delivered to houses daily. Before milk bottles were available, milkmen took churns on their rounds and filled the customers' jugs by dipping a measure into the churn. Due to improved packaging and the introduction of more refrigerators and cooling appliances in private homes, the need for milk delivery has decreased over the past half-century. These advances contributed to the decline or loss of services in many localities, from daily deliveries to just three days a week or less in others.

Milk deliveries frequently occur in the morning. It is also common for milkmen and milkwomen to deliver products other than milk, including butter, cream, cheese, eggs, meat and vegetables.

In some areas, apartments and houses have small milk-delivery doors. These are small wooden cabinets inside the residence, built into the exterior wall, with doors on both sides that are latched but not locked, to allow groceries or milk to be placed inside the box when delivered and when collected by the resident.

Vehicles

Horse-drawn vehicles were used for local delivery from the inception of the first milk round around 1860. These were still seen in Britain in the 1950s and parts of the United States until the 1960s. Now, motorized vehicles are used. First introduced in 1889, battery vehicles saw expanded use in 1931 and by 1967 had given Britain the largest electric vehicle fleet in the world.

Around the world

Americas
In 1963, nearly 29.7 percent of consumers in the US had milk delivered, but by 1975, the number had dropped to 6.9 percent of total sales.

In 2005, about 0.4% of consumers in the United States had their milk delivered, and a handful of newer companies had sprung up to offer the service. Some U.S. dairies have been delivering milk for about 100 years, with interest continuing to increase in the 2010s as part of the local food movement. During the 2020 coronavirus outbreak, some remaining milkmen saw demand increase suddenly (similar to other grocery delivery services) due to concerns about the infection risk involved with shopping in stores.

Asia
In India, those delivering milk usually use milk churns, a practice that has ceased in western countries. On the road, they are put on any kind of vehicle. In big cities such as Mumbai, milk churns are often transported in luggage compartments in local trains.

In the Philippines, the milkman or milkmaid is called lechero. The tradition stemmed from the community production of carabao milk, which the lechero delivers fresh to their designated barangay (village). The lechero heritage used to be widely practiced in the country but declined after the introduction of store-bought milk during the American-occupation period. Nowadays, only a few communities have lecheros, notably in Nueva Ecija province, the milk capital of the Philippines.

Oceania
In Australia, the delivery vehicle was usually a small petrol or diesel truck with a covered milk-tray. In hotter areas, this tray is usually insulated.

Europe

Milkmen appeared in Britain around 1860, when the first railways allowed fresh milk to arrive in cities from the countryside. By 1880, the milk was delivered in bottles. By 1975, 94% of milk was in glass bottles, but in 1990, supermarkets started offering plastic and carton containers, reducing bottled milk from 94% to 3% by 2016. In the 20th century, milk delivery in urban areas of Europe has been carried out from an electric vehicle called a milk float.

Cultural impact

The comedy films The Milkman (1950) starring Donald O'Connor, and The Early Bird (1965), starring Norman Wisdom, portrayed the profession in the US and UK respectively.

Tevye the Dairyman (Tevye der milkhiker) is the fictional pious Jewish narrator and protagonist of a series of short stories by Sholem Aleichem, and various adaptations of them, the most famous being the stage/film musical Fiddler on the Roof.

Stephen King's short story "Morning Deliveries (Milkman No. 1)" (in the horror anthology Skeleton Crew (1985)), concerns a milkman who kills people by leaving "surprises" (including poison, toxic gas, and venomous spiders) in their milk cans.

The title of the pop hit "No Milk Today" (1966) by the British band Herman's Hermits refers to a common notice instructing the milkperson not to leave the usual order of milk on a particular day. In the song, this symbolizes the singer's recent breakup with his love interest who has just moved out of his house.

The British comedian Benny Hill, himself a former milkman, had a hit novelty song called "Ernie (The Fastest Milkman In The West)" (1971).

Ella Mae Morse had a US top 10 hit with "Milkman, Keep Those Bottles Quiet", from the film Broadway Rhythm (1944).

The (unnamed) milkwoman was an occasional character in British sitcom Open All Hours, the object of Granville's desire. Despite working early mornings just as Granville did, she was also a part-time university student and a divorcee, representing aspirations of a life lived beyond the terraced streets of the local neighborhood.

Episode 3 of the third series of television comedy series Father Ted is entitled Speed 3 and centers around the lascivious behavior of milkman Pat Mustard, Ted's feud with him, and the tragic outcome.

In Raymond Briggs' graphic novel Ethel and Ernest, based on the true story of Mr. Briggs' parents, Ernest Briggs (Raymond's father) is described as being a milkman for the R.A.C.S.

Anna Burns's novel Milkman features both a real milkman and an Irish paramilitary known as 'Milkman' who sexually harasses the protagonist before being killed.

In 1984, the band Level 42 released their song, Kansas City Milkman.  The meaning of the song portrays a milkman as an average blue-collar worker, without enough disposable income to travel, hence his knowledge of the world outside of his hometown is naive and limited to what he reads in the newspapers.  Also the message is that his ignorance is bliss, asking the question if he would he really want to know the true nature of the world.  The irony of the song is that it is written by Mark King and Philip Gould, British people with the tacit assumption that Milkmen were equally common in large American cities as they were in Britain during that era.

Gallery

See also
Milkmaid
Milkman joke
Yakult lady

References

External links 

Food 52: A History of the American Milkman
The Milkman's Comeback Means Dairy At The Door And More

Dairy industry
Transport occupations
Milk transport